Tucker Albrizzi (born February 25, 2000) is an American actor. He is best known for his roles as Tyler Duncan on Big Time Rush, Jake on Good Luck Charlie, Randall Snyder on American Vandal and Colin McConnell on A.P. Bio.  He has appeared in such movies as I Am Number Four, Bridesmaids, Sicko, Alvin and the Chipmunks: Chipwrecked, and ParaNorman.

Personal life
Albrizzi was born and raised in Palm Harbor, Florida, the son of Claudine Andrews and Keith Albrizzi, and the brother of Patrick Pedraja and Chef Jocelyn Albrizzi.

Career
He began acting in commercials in Orlando, Florida in 2007 when he was 7 years old. His brother Patrick was diagnosed with leukemia later that year and created a charity called Driving for Donors, which adds marrow donors to the Be The Match National Marrow Donor Program. Albrizzi and his family spent the next year traveling the country in an RV holding marrow drives for Driving For Donors. He came to Los Angeles in 2008 to be in a documentary with Patrick about Driving For Donors and decided to try acting in Hollywood. Albrizzi and his brother appeared together in Michael Moore's Sicko and as guests on The Late Late Show with Craig Ferguson.

Within 2 months of arriving in Hollywood, Albrizzi booked his first series regular role in Bless This Mess. In 2009, he was cast in the recurring role of Tyler on Big Time Rush. Later that year, he was also cast in the recurring role of Jake, Gabe's best friend, on Good Luck Charlie and guest starred on many other TV shows as well.

In 2010, Albrizzi began acting in movies with appearances in Bridesmaids, I Am Number Four, and Treasure Buddies. In 2011, he was originally cast in Ted in the role of Robert, but he was unable to film because of scheduling conflicts with his work on the Disney XD pilot Pack of Wolves. In the same year, he also got a role as the Kite Kid in Alvin and the Chipmunks: Chipwrecked.

In 2016, Albrizzi co-starred in the science fiction action film Monster Trucks. In 2017, he starred in the feature film, Bully, as the lead character Jimmy Mulligan.  Albrizzi also played the recurring role of Terry in 10 episodes of the YouTube series Foursome. He also appeared as Randall Snyder in the first 4 episodes of the Netflix series American Vandal.  Albrizzi appears in all 13 episodes of the first season of A.P. Bio, as Colin McConnell. He plays Walter Dobbs in all 10 episodes of the first season of Mr. Iglesias on Netflix.

Voiceover work
Albrizzi began voice acting with 2012's ParaNorman, in the role of Neil. He was also the voice of Budderball in Treasure Buddies (replacing Josh Flitter from the first Air Buddies) and played the live-action role of Budderball's owner Bartleby in the movies.

Filmography

Movies

Television

Awards and nominations
 32nd Young Artist Awards
 Best Guest Star Performance in a TV Series – Good Luck Charlie (Won)
 Best Recurring Performance in a TV Series – Big Time Rush (Nominated)
 33rd Young Artist Awards
 Best Performance in a TV Series – Guest Starring Young Actor Ten and Under – Big Time Rush (Nominated)
 Best Performance in a DVD Film – Young Ensemble Cast – Spooky Buddies (Won)

References

External links
 Official website
 

2000 births
Living people
American male film actors
American male television actors
American male voice actors
American male child actors
People from Palm Harbor, Florida
Male actors from Florida
21st-century American male actors